Sir Stephen Gomersall  is a British diplomat and businessman.  

He was educated at Forest School, Snaresbrook and Queens' College, Cambridge. After 14 years serving as a diplomat in Japan and as British ambassador, 1999–2004, he became Chief Executive of Hitachi Europe Ltd. at the age of 56. His previous roles have included Director of International Security at the Foreign and Commonwealth Office, Ambassador and Deputy Permanent Representative of the UK Mission to the United Nations and Head of Security Policy Department, FCO.  He now works as Chief Executive (Europe) for Hitachi Global.

On 29 April 2015, The Government of Japan bestowed the Grand Cordon of the Order of the Rising Sun, upon Sir Stephen John Gomersall, KCMG.

See also
Heads of the United Kingdom Mission in Japan
Anglo-Japanese relations

References

External links
Hitachi appoints Sir Stephen Gomersall KCMG as Chief Executive for Europe
Sir Stephen Gomersall KCMG discusses the state of contemporary cricket journalism
Sir Stephen Gomersall KCMG awarded the Grand Cordon of the Order of the Rising Sun

Knights Commander of the Order of St Michael and St George
British expatriates in Japan
Living people
Year of birth missing (living people)
Ambassadors of the United Kingdom to Japan
People educated at Forest School, Walthamstow
20th-century British diplomats
21st-century British diplomats
Alumni of Queens' College, Cambridge